United India Insurance Company is an Indian government-owned insurance company headquartered in Chennai, Tamil Nadu. It was incorporated on 18 February 1938 and nationalised in 1972.

History 
Previously, it was a subsidiary of the General Insurance Corporation of India (GIC). But when GIC became a re-insurance company as per the IRDA Act 1999, its four primary insurance subsidiaries New India Assurance, United India Insurance, Oriental Insurance and National Insurance obtained autonomy, with effect from 21 March 2003.

Twelve Indian insurance companies, four co-operative insurance societies, five foreign insurers with Indian operations and the general insurance operations of the southern region of Life Insurance Corporation of India were merged with United India Insurance Company Limited to form the company.

Since nationalization, United India has 14,322 number of workforce spread across 2,248 offices providing insurance cover to more than 10 million policy holders. 

United India has been in the forefront of designing and implementing complex covers to large customers, as in the cases of ONGC Ltd, BHEL, NTPC, Jindal Industries, GMR – Hyderabad International Airport Ltd., Mumbai International Airport Ltd., Tirumala-Tirupati Devasthanam, Kochi Metro Rail Corporation etc. United India has also been the pioneer in taking Insurance to the rural masses with the large scale implementation of Universal Health Insurance Programme of Government of India & Vijaya Raji Janani Kalyan Yojana (covering 4.5 million women in the state of Madhya Pradesh), Tsunami Jan Bima Yojana (in 4 states covering 4,59,000 of families), National Livestock Insurance and many such schemes.

The Gross Domestic Premium for the Financial Year 2019–20 is more than ₹17,500 Crores.

On 2 February 2018, the Government of India announced merger of United India Insurance Company with Oriental Insurance and National Insurance Company Limited.

Organizational structure

References

External links 
 

Financial services companies established in 1938
General insurance companies of India
Government-owned insurance companies of India
Companies nationalised by the Government of India
Financial services companies based in Chennai
Indian companies established in 1938
2018 mergers and acquisitions